Serafín Ríos Álvarez (born 20 July 1959) is a Mexican politician affiliated with the Party of the Democratic Revolution. As of 2014 he served as Senator of the LVIII and LIX Legislatures of the Mexican Congress representing Michoacán.

References

1959 births
Living people
Politicians from Michoacán
Members of the Senate of the Republic (Mexico)
Party of the Democratic Revolution politicians
21st-century Mexican politicians